The Electoral Commission is an election commission with responsibility for the oversight of all elections in Ireland, including electoral operations, constituency reviews and electoral integrity. It was established in 2023. Prior to its establishment, some of these functions had been carried out by various government departments, statutory agencies and components of the Oireachtas, while other functions are novel to the Commission.

A proposal on an electoral commission was first considered in a government report commissioned in 2008, and was developed by a series of governments since then, before the publication of heads of bill in 2021.

Organisation
The Electoral Commission was established on 9 February 2023 under the Electoral Reform Act 2022 by order of the Minister for Housing, Local Government and Heritage, Darragh O'Brien.

In March 2021 it was announced that Art O'Leary, upon completion in June 2021 of his seven-year term as Secretary General to the President, would be appointed to work on the preparatory institutional and administrative arrangements for the commission, pending its formal establishment.

The 2023 budget earmarks €5.7m for the commission and a further €2.77m to enable local authorities to modernise the electoral register.

Membership
The Commission may consist of between 7 and 9 members: a chair appointed from the judiciary, two  members, and four to six ordinary members.

Functions
The functions of the Commission are defined by the Electoral Reform Act 2022.

Electoral operations
Referendum campaigns
Constituency and electoral boundary reviews
Registration of political parties
Oversight of the electoral register

Electoral integrity
Regulation of online electoral information (This part of the Electoral Reform Act 2022 (Part 5) has not yet been commenced)
Regulation of online advertising during election periods (This part of the Electoral Reform Act 2022 (Part 4) has not yet been commenced)
Post electoral event reviews
Advice

History
An electoral commission was recommended by several official reports, including the Second Report (2006) of the Commission on Electronic Voting. Private member's bills to establish an electoral commission were introduced by Ciarán Lynch in 2008 and 2012.

In 2008, the Department of the Environment, Heritage and Local Government commissioned and published a study on introducing an electoral commission, carried out by academics from University College Dublin. After the 2011 general election, the  Fine Gael and Labour parties formed  a coalition government  whose programme included a commitment to establish an electoral commission. Such a commission was also recommended in the Constitutional Convention's 2013 report on the system of elections to Dáil Éireann (lower house of the Oireachtas), which was also endorsed the government. Alan Kelly, the Minister for the Environment, Community and Local Government, outlined progress of the plan in Seanad Éireann in December 2014, The government published a consultation paper in January 2015, and said it intended to introduce a bill in the Oireachtas in 2015. The Oireachtas Joint Committee on Environment, Culture and the Gaeltacht discussed the plan with Alan Kelly on 10 March 2015. Kelly stated that drafting the enabling bill would begin when the committee had consulted and reported back to him, that he expected the bill to be enacted by the end of 2015, that the commission would not be established before the next general election, and that functions should be assigned to it on a phased basis. In April 2015 the committee invited submissions on the government's consultation paper from interest groups, and held hearings with them in June and July. The committee's report was launched on 14 January 2016.

After the 2016 general election, a minority coalition government was formed by Fine Gael and Independent TDs with confidence and supply support from Fianna Fáil. Its programme committed to establishing an electoral commission "independent of Government and directly accountable to the Oireachtas". The government's September 2016 list of planned legislation includes the Electoral Commission Bill in the Department of Housing, Planning, Community and Local Government's "medium and long term" plans. In June 2017, the department was preparing a Regulatory Impact Analysis (RIA). In October 2017, Taoiseach Leo Varadkar said there was "no timeframe" for establishing the commission and it was "very much a long-term project". In September 2018 John Paul Phelan, Minister of State for Local Government and Electoral Reform, gave an update to the Seanad. He said a priority was "modernisation" of the electoral register, which different local authorities had been maintaining in divergent manners; this would take "two to three years", involve "significant public consultation", and proceed separately from work on an Electoral Commission. The Electoral Commission RIA published in November 2018 compared four implementation strategies. The ensuing public consultation received 23 submissions by the closing date of 15 March 2019. In July 2019 Phelan said work was commencing on drafting the general scheme (outline) of an Electoral Commission Bill.

2021 draft bill 
Negotiations after the February 2020 general election led to the formation in June of a Fianna Fáil–Fine Gael–Green coalition, whose programme for government promised an electoral commission by the end of 2021. Malcolm Noonan was appointed as Minister of State at the Department of Housing, Local Government and Heritage with responsibility for heritage and electoral reform.

The Department of Housing, Local Government and Heritage produced the general scheme of an Electoral Reform Bill, which was approved by the cabinet on 30 December 2020 and published on 8 January 2021. The scheme was submitted for pre-legislative scrutiny to an Oireachtas Joint Committee, which had public meetings with invited parties between 23 January and 22 June and issued its report in August.

The draft bill  sought both to modernise the electoral register and to establish an electoral commission with seven to nine members and a permanent staff. The establishment provisions are modelled on the Policing Authority established in 2015.

The commission would comprise:
 five to seven members appointed by the President of Ireland:
 the Chairperson, a current or former judge of the superior courts, nominated by the Chief Justice, appointed for a seven-year term;
 four to six experts recommended by the Commission for Public Service Appointments and nominated by the government with Oireachtas approval for a four-year term
 two  members:
 the Ombudsman
 the Clerk of Dáil Éireann or Seanad Éireann, alternating every four years;

The commission's staff would be members of the Civil Service of the State, with a Chief Executive recommended by the Commission for Public Service Appointments.

Envisaged functions
The Constitutional Convention took the Australian Electoral Commission and UK Electoral Commission as case studies of possible models for the Irish body. The various official reports listed functions which might be performed by the commission, and noted who is currently responsible for them. The bill published in 2021 would give some of these as "initial functions" to the commission it establishes, leaving open the possibility for others to be transferred to it at a later date. Academics addressing a pre-legislative scrutiny meeting said the bill lacked ambition and the commission's structure left it "little room for expansion" to new activities.

Notes

References
 
 
 
 
 
 [JCHLGH] Oireachtas Joint Committee on Housing, Local Government and Heritage, General Scheme of the Electoral Reform Bill 2020: Discussion (2021) 22 Jan, 2 Feb, 23 Mar, 30 Mar, 20 May, 22 Jun

Citations

External links
 
 The Electoral Commission, Citizens Information Board
 Public Consultation on an Electoral Commission in Ireland (2015–2016) Oireachtas Joint Committee on Environment, Culture and the Gaeltacht
 topic Electoral Commission, Government of Ireland website

Ireland
Elections in the Republic of Ireland
Electoral reform in the Republic of Ireland
2023 in the Republic of Ireland
2023 establishments in Ireland
Department of Housing, Local Government and Heritage